Juris Alunāns (official name Gustavs Georgs Frīdrihs Alunāns; May 13, 1832 – April 18, 1864) was a Latvian writer and philologist in the Russian Empire.  He was one of the first contributors of Latvian language. He was one of the members of the Young Latvia movement.

Alunāns created about 500 neologisms, most of which quickly incorporated in the everyday Latvian language and are still used.

References

External links
 Bio

1832 births
1864 deaths
People from Madona Municipality
People from Kreis Wenden
Latvian philologists
Linguists from the Russian Empire
Writers from the Russian Empire
19th-century Latvian people
University of Tartu alumni